The Nodding Folk was the name of an industrial music supergroup with members David Tibet, James Mannox, John Balance, Peter Christopherson, Sam Mannox-Wood, Simon Norris, and Steven Stapleton from the groups Current 93, Spasm, Nurse with Wound, Cyclobe and Coil. The group got together specifically to record a single album, The Apocalyptic Folk in The Nodding God Unveiled, a CD which was coupled with a comic book and released in 1993.

The Apocalyptic Folk in The Nodding God Unveiled
"Children of the Nodapoc Gather Round" - 3:26
"Love Dance of the Nodding Folk" - 5:48

References

External links
Group entry at discogs.com

English electronic music groups
British experimental musical groups
Cultural depictions of pop musicians
Comics based on musical groups